Homosassa platella is a species of snout moth in the genus Homosassa. It was described by Jay C. Shaffer in 1968. It is found in North America, including Florida and Mississippi.

References

Moths described in 1968
Anerastiini